Philip H. Sheridan Elementary School is a historic elementary school located in the Kensington neighborhood of Philadelphia, Pennsylvania. It is part of the School District of Philadelphia The building was built in 1899–1900, and is a three-story, five-bay, stone-and-brick building in the Colonial Revival style. Three-story wings were added 1902 and 1910. It features a stone entrance pavilion, Palladian windows, and large arched openings. The school was named for Civil War General Philip Sheridan (1831–1888), one of the most famous Union generals of the Civil War, who is most well-known for overseeing brutal campaigns against Native Americans. It was added to the National Register of Historic Places in 1988.

In June 2022 it was announced that parents, faculty, students and community members voted to change the name of the school to the Gloria Casarez Elementary School. “We were looking to find a name that represented our school and the goal of inclusion,” said Sheridan’s assistant principal Julio Nunez. Gloria Casarez was the City of Philadelphia’s first director of LGBT affairs, appointed in 2008. During her tenure, Philly adopted the broadest LGBT rights protection in the country and became ranked as the number one city nationwide for LGBT equality.  Casarez attended Sheridan Elementary School.

References

External links

School buildings on the National Register of Historic Places in Philadelphia
Colonial Revival architecture in Pennsylvania
School buildings completed in 1900
Kensington, Philadelphia
Public elementary schools in Philadelphia
School District of Philadelphia
1900 establishments in Pennsylvania